"Prayin' for Daylight" is a song written by Steve Bogard and Rick Giles and recorded by American country music group Rascal Flatts. It was released in February 2000 as the first single from the band's self-titled debut album and as their debut single. The song reached number 3 on the U.S. Billboard Hot Country Singles & Tracks (now Hot Country Songs) chart.

Content
The song is a moderate up-tempo song in which the narrator's lover has just left him, and he has not been able to sleep.

Background
On the band's website, Jay DeMarcus commented on the recording of  "Prayin' For Daylight".
The first single. That was the first tune we ever cut as a group, and the first song that Lyric Street ever heard us do. It was very, very instrumental in getting our deal.  We love the song. It's a very memorable kind of chorus and it just showcases what we can do as well as the band. I think if somebody said tell us what you're all about, we could play that song and they'd get a pretty good picture of what we can do. "Prayin' For Daylight" was special because at the last minute we changed the feel of the whole song. The demo was really, really different and what's become the little, hooky guitar riff, that happened moments before we went to tape."

Chart performance
"Prayin' for Daylight" debuted at number 60 on the U.S. Billboard Hot Country Singles & Tracks for the week of March 4, 2000. The song spent thirty-one weeks on the U.S. Billboard Hot Country Singles & Tracks chart, reaching a peak of number 3. The single's B-side, "Long Slow Beautiful Dance," spent two weeks on the same chart in December 2000, peaking at number 73.

Year-end charts

Certifications

References

2000 songs
2000 debut singles
Rascal Flatts songs
Music videos directed by Trey Fanjoy
Song recordings produced by Mark Bright (record producer)
Songs written by Steve Bogard
Songs written by Rick Giles
Lyric Street Records singles